Middle Branch Reservoir is a reservoir in the New York City water supply system  located in the Town of Southeast in Putnam County, 35 miles (65 km) north of the city.  Created in 1878 by damming the Middle Branch of the Croton River, it is one of twelve in the Croton Watershed.

Middle Branch covers 400 acres (1.6 km²), with an average depth of 31 feet (9.4 m), although some areas in the reservoir's southern extent reach 50 feet (15 m). It drains an area of 21 square miles (55 km²) reaching into Dutchess County. At full capacity, it holds 4.1 billion gallons (6.4 million m³).

Notes

See also
List of reservoirs and dams in New York

References

External links

Reservoirs in New York (state)
Croton Watershed
Protected areas of Putnam County, New York
Reservoirs in Putnam County, New York